The "Kosher tax" (or "Jewish tax") is the idea that food companies and unwitting consumers are forced to pay money to support Judaism or Zionist causes and Israel through the costs of kosher certification. The claim is generally considered a conspiracy theory, antisemitic canard, or urban legend.

Common refutations include that consumers who prefer kosher foods include not only Jews but also Muslims, Seventh-day Adventists, and others, food companies actively seek kosher certification to increase market share and profitability; the fees collected support the certifying organizations themselves and that extra business generated by the voluntary certification process more than makes up for the cost of supervision and so the certification does not necessarily increase the price of products and may, in fact, result in per item cost savings.

Claims
The kosher tax conspiracy theory claims that the kosher certification of products (typically food) is an extra tax collected from unwitting consumers for the benefit of Jewish organizations. It is mainly spread by antisemitic, white supremacist, and other extremist organizations, and is considered a canard or urban legend. Similar claims are made that this "Kosher tax" (or "Jewish tax") is "extorted" from food companies wishing to avoid a boycott, and used to support Zionist causes or the state of Israel.

University of Pittsburgh professor of sociology Kathleen M. Blee reported that some racist groups encourage consumers to avoid this "Jewish tax" by boycotting kosher products.

Canada
The 2000 Annual Audit of Antisemitic Incidents by the B'nai Brith Canada reported citizens being encouraged to request a refund from the government on their income taxes.

In 1997 the Canada Revenue Agency issued a news release noting the existence of flyers recommending that consumers claim a deduction on their taxes "because they supposedly contributed to a Jewish religious organization when they purchased these groceries." In it Jane Stewart, then Minister of National Revenue stated, "The intent and message in this literature is deeply offensive to the Jewish community and, indeed, to all Canadians. The so-called 'deduction' described in these flyers does not exist and I urge all taxpayers to ignore this misleading advice".

During the 2014 Quebec provincial election campaign, Parti Québécois (PQ) candidate and academic Louise Mailloux defended the PQ government's proposed Quebec Charter of Values by asserting that kosher and halal certification was a religious tax used to fund religious wars and enrich religious leaders. The Centre for Israel and Jewish Affairs called on the PQ to debunk the “urban legend of the kosher tax” but PQ leader and Premier of Quebec Pauline Marois defended her candidate's comments saying of Mailloux, "Her writings are eloquent, I respect her point of view.”

Refutation 

Although companies may apply for kosher certification, the cost of the certification is typically minuscule, and is more than offset by the advantages of being certified. In 1975 the cost per item for obtaining kosher certification was reported by The New York Times to be 6.5 millionths of a cent ($0.000000065) for a General Foods frozen-food item.

Certification leads to increased revenues by opening up additional markets to Jews who keep kosher, Muslims who keep halal, Seventh-day Adventists, vegetarians, and the lactose intolerant who wish to avoid dairy products (products that are reliably certified as pareve meet this criterion).

Quebec's Bouchard-Taylor Commission on Reasonable Accommodation refuted what it described as "[t]he most fanciful information is circulating among Quebeckers” about the so-called kosher tax in its 2008 report and stated that there was no evidence of price inflation as a result of kosher certification and that rabbis made little money from granting certification.

According to Berel Wein, "The cost of kashrut certification is always viewed as an advertising expense and not as a manufacturing expense." Dispellers of the "kosher tax" legend argue that if it were not profitable to obtain such certification, then food producers would not engage in the certification process, and that the increased sales resulting from kosher certification actually lower the overall cost per item. Avi Shafran adds that "[i]f the kosher item in fact proves more expensive, [the consumer] can simply opt for one that hasn’t been supervised by a rabbi..."

Obtaining certification that an item is kosher is a voluntary business decision made by companies desiring additional sales from consumers (both Jewish and non-Jewish) who look for kosher certification when shopping. According to Snopes, the fees charged for kosher certification are used to support the operation of the certifying bodies themselves, and not "some special Jewish fund used to advance Zionist causes".

Notes

References

"The 'Kosher Tax' Hoax: Anti-Semitic Recipe for Hate" , Anti-Defamation League, January, 1991. Retrieved November 3, 2013.
Blee, Kathleen M. Inside Organized Racism: Women in the Hate Movement, University of California Press, 2003, 
2000 Annual Audit of Antisemitic Incidents, B'nai Brith Canada, 2000. Retrieved April 24, 2007.
"Dispelling a rumor – there is no kosher tax or Jewish tax", Boycott Watch, December 22, 2003. Retrieved November 3, 2013.
Brunvand, Jan Herald. Encyclopedia of Urban Legends, "The Jewish Secret Tax", W. W. Norton & Company, Nov 1, 2002. 
"Revenue Minister concerned by tax deduction misinformation", Canada Revenue Agency news release, March 10, 1997.
Kaplan, Jeffery & Weinberg, Leonard. The Emergence of a Euro American Radical Right, Rutgers University Press, February 1, 1999. 
Levenson, Barry M. Habeas Codfish: Reflections on Food and the Law, University of Wisconsin Press, 2001. 
Luban, Yaakov. "The 'Kosher Tax' Fraud", Orthodox Union. Retrieved November 3, 2013.
Lungen, Paul. "Jewish, Muslim groups join forces join to protect ritual slaughter", Canadian Jewish News, February 20, 2003.
Mikkelson, Barbara. "The Kosher Nostra", Urban Legends Reference Pages, May 24, 2002. Retrieved October 23, 2006.
Anti-Semitism: 'Patriot' publications taking on anti-Semitic edge, Southern Poverty Law Center, Intelligence Report, Winter 2002.
Shafran, Avi. "Yes Bubba, It's a Jewish Plot", Cross-Currents, January 19, 2007.
Sullum, Jacob. "Columns: Kosher Cops", The Freeman, Vol. 43 No.  7, July, 1993.
Tuchman, Aryeh. "Dietary Laws", in Levy, Richard S. Antisemitism: A Historical Encyclopedia of Prejudice and Persecution, ABC-CLIO, 2005. 
Wein, Berel. "The problem with Shinui", The Jerusalem Post, December 26, 2006.

Antisemitic canards
Conspiracy theories involving Jews
Kosher food
Misconceptions